Campeones may refer to:

 Campeones de la vida, Argentine telenovela
 Campeones Cup, North American soccer tournament
 Campeones - Oliver Y Benji, long-running Japanese manga series
 Campeones de la vida (Mexican TV series), Mexican telenovela 
 Campeones (film), 2018 Spanish comedy-drama film directed by Javier Fesser
 Campeones del 36, multi-use stadium in Sullana, Peru